Cinzia Giorgio (born April 1, 1975, in Venosa, Province of Potenza) is an Italian writer.

Biography 
Cinzia Giorgio was born in Venosa, Italy, in April 1975. She has a degree in modern literature at University of Naples Federico II, her thesis was about the history of the renaissance. She has also earned a second degree in Oriental languages and has a specialisation in women's studies and archaeology. In 2001 she married Giovanni Scattone, a former assistant professor convicted of the manslaughter of student Marta Russo (1997).

In 2002 she won a scholarship from the Bellonci Foundation in Rome, which organises the Strega Prize.

She is currently Professor of Women's Studies and Art History at the Uni.Spe.D. of Rome and she has a PhD in comparative literature from Roma Tre University. She is also the director of the creative writing school of Rome Scuola Romana di Scrittura.

She has published articles for online newspapers "Poste italiane" (Italian post office) and "Special Olympics". She has published articles for magazines: "Anna" (one of the most important Italian magazine), "AIFI", "Spirit", "Nuovi Orizzonti", "Grand Hotel" and "Confidenze".
She has worked with the French weekly "Neus Deux" writing novels and short stories. She has also worked with Warde Jones press office – c/o Foreign Press of Rome, with the director Massimo Tonna and with the Basilicata Region press office .

She writes for the online magazine "Sherlock Magazine" and teaches Creative Writing. She is also writing plays for the Theater. She has her own literary review in Pink Magazine Italia.

In December 2007 she was invited to "Niente di Personale", a talk show broadcast on Italian TV La7, where she presented the novel "Sotto il fiume". Taking inspiration from the novel she wrote a theatre play directed by Flavia Ricci.

On August 4, 2009, and on October 17, 2009, she was the guest of the evening newscast on La7, where she presented her novels I custodi dell'Acqua and Incognito.
From March 2010 she collaborates with the website, Velut Luna Press specialised in literary reviews.
In 2011 she one of the five candidates to the Mondadori Mystery Award Premio Tedeschi with the novel L'Enigma Botticelli published in 2013. She is also the organizer of the Roman Salon Littéraire (Literary conferences) at the Leusso Academy.

In 2014 for the Italian publishing house Rizzoli she wrote "Prime catastrofiche impressioni" and "Cosa Farebbe Jane?" the first two novels of the series "Le ragazze di Jane Austen".

In November 2014 came out her essay on the erotic history of Italy, "Storia Erotica d'Italia" published by Newton Compton.

Works

Novels 
  Mary Magdalene, Newton Compton 2018. 
  La piccola libreria di Venezia, Newton Compton 2017. 
  La collezionista di libri proibiti, Newton Compton 2016. 
  L'amore è una formula matematica, Rizzoli 2015. 
  Prime Catastrofiche Impressioni, Rizzoli 2014. 
  Cosa Farebbe Jane?, Rizzoli 2014. .
  Il Bello della Diretta, Rizzoli 2014. 
  L'Enigma Botticelli, Melino Nerella 2013.

Essays 
"È facile vivere bene a Roma se sai cosa fare", Newton Compton, 2016, 
"Storia Pettegola d'Italia", Newton Compton, 2015, 
"Storia Erotica d'Italia", Newton Compton, 2014, 
 Il Rinascimento Italiano nel fumetto in Narrare la storia dal documento al racconto, Mondadori, Milan,2006 
 Disegno letterario: Il fumetto come strumento educativo, SSEF, 2006
 Ragazze di pochi mezzi, SSEF, 2007
 Fumetto ed educazione, in Generazioni, Unisped, Roma, 2008
 La povertà nella letteratura in Generazioni, Unisped, Roma, 2009
 La donna in Fontane, Rivista di Studi Umanistici Leussein, Rome University Press, 2009
 La Profetessa di Sventure: rielaborazione del mito di Cassandra nella letteratura occidentale, Rivista di Studi Umanistici Leussein, Rome University Press, 2009
 Postfazione al romanzo "Il mio nome è Aqua Caliente" by Claudio De Luca, 2009
 Echi del Mito di Cassandra in Muriel Spark, Rivista di Studi Umanistici Leussein, Rome University Press, 2010
 Interpretazioni del mito di Pandora, Rivista di Studi Umanistici Leussein, Rome University Press, 2010
 Le sorelle Bronte nel manga giapponese, atti del convegno "Contaminazioni Creative", Università di Roma Tre, 2011
 I Narratori delle Tele, Rivista di Studi Umanistici Leussein, Rome University Press, 2012
 Orgoglio senza Pregiudizio. Le ragazze di Jane Austen, Edizioni Opposto, 2013
 Storia Erotica d'Italia, Newton Compton, 2014  .

Plays 
 Sotto il fiume, directed by Flavia Ricci, 2007.
 S. Holmes e il mistero della Mummia., directed by Anna Masullo, 2011.
 Il raduno dei pirati e il terrificante mistero del vascello fantasma,directed by Anna Masullo, 2012.

References

External links 
 
 literary reviews website

1975 births
Living people
People from Venosa
21st-century Italian novelists
Italian women novelists
21st-century Italian women writers